Dinitrogen dioxide is an inorganic compound having molecular formula . Many structural isomers are possible. The covalent bonding pattern O=N–N=O (a non-cyclic dimer of nitric oxide (NO)) is predicted to be the most stable isomer based on ab initio calculations and is the only one that has been experimentally produced. In the solid form, the molecules have C2v symmetry: the entire structure is planar, with the two oxygen atoms cis across the N–N bond. The O–N distance is 1.15 Å, the N–N distance is 2.33 Å, and the O=N–N angle is 95°.

References 

 
 
 

Nitrogen oxides
Azines (hydrazine derivatives)